Kalinówka  is a settlement in the administrative district of Gmina Sidra, within Sokółka County, Podlaskie Voivodeship, in north-eastern Poland.

References

Villages in Sokółka County